The 1916 Canton Bulldogs season was their eighth season in the Ohio League. The team finished 9-0-1 to clinch their first sole league title.

Schedule

Game notes

Top Ohio League team consensus standings

References

Canton Bulldogs seasons
Canton Bulldogs
Canton Bulldogs